Nikola Kalabić (20 December 1906 – 19 January 1946) was a Serbian Chetnik commander during World War II.

Early life
He was born to father Milan and mother Joka in Podnovlje (municipality of Doboj) in present-day Republika Srpska. He had a sister named Angelina (1912–1999).

Nikola's father separated from Joka after World War I and proceeded to get married three times. Nikola lived with his father at first so he attended school in places where his father served with the Serbian army. He eventually finished six grades of gymnasium before becoming a student of geodesy in Belgrade. During his studies, he met Borka (a year younger than him) who was born in Rajkovići near Valjevo in present-day Serbia into a family of old supporters of the People's Radical Party and Nikola Pašić. Borka and Nikola married in 1929 and on 3 August 1930 they had twins Mirjana and Milan. Their first service was in Belgrade. They then moved to Aranđelovac and finally back to Valjevo (where there are Kalabićs today). Nikola Kalabić (until the start of World War II) worked in Land-registry management in Valjevo.

World War II
During World War II, Nikola Kalabić was commander of Draža Mihailović's formation named the Mountain Guard Corps. On 26 November 1943, together with the General Inspector of Chetnik Troops Colonel Simić, he concluded a formal collaboration agreement with the representative of the German Military Commander in Southeast Europe, General der Infanterie (Lieutenant General) Hans Felber.

In the night of 25th of December 1943, Chetniks under command of Nikola Kalabić killed a large number of civilians in village of Kopljare, near Aranđelovac. Out of 22 killed, 19 were Romani. In a letter to Draža Mihailović, Kalabić wrote: In Kopljere we caught while sleeping and slayed 24 active communists, out of which 20 were Gypsies, who admitted to be so-called jarugaši, at day they do their housework, but at night in action. I killed them all. There is no proof that any of victims were involved with KPJ or involved in any armed fights. Source of Ministry of Interior of quisling government has a more precise description of the massacre, as they mention murder of 22 civilians, 19 Romani, of which 15 male and 4 female. It also mentions that Chetniks burnt all Romani houses, as well as houses of two peasants whose family members were members of partisans. Mountain Guard Corps under Kalabić committed similar acts of terror against pro-partizan population in central Serbia, including massacre in Drugovac, single largest Chetnik massacre in any Serb village.

Capture and alleged collaboration with the OZNA
Near the very end of the war, Kalabić and many other Chetniks tried to hide in rural areas of the country, awaiting an attempt to overthrow the new government. The OZNA had a plan to capture former members of the Chetnik movement and other military organizations outside of Yugoslavia. There, OZNA agents infiltrated the support network of Kalabić and arrested him in a covert operation on 5 December 1945.

After a few days, Kalabić agreed to collaborate with the OZNA in their efforts of locating and arresting Draža Mihailović, in return for immunity from prosecution. This claim however has been brought into question by family members of Kalabić claiming that he did not betray Mihailović. Kalabić was then executed by Yugoslav Partisans although this claim has also been questioned.

Rehabilitation attempts
Kalabić was rehabilitated by the High Court in Valjevo in May 2017. This decision however was overturned by an appellate court in Belgrade in May 2018. On 7 August 2022, he was officially rehabilitated by the High Court in Valjevo.

References

Sources
 
 

1906 births
1946 deaths
People from Doboj
Military personnel from Valjevo
Serbs of Bosnia and Herzegovina
People from the Condominium of Bosnia and Herzegovina
Recipients of the Order of the Yugoslav Crown
Geodesists
Royal Yugoslav Army personnel of World War II
Chetnik personnel of World War II
Serbian anti-communists
Executed Serbian collaborators with Nazi Germany
People executed by Yugoslavia
Chetnik war crimes in World War II
Executed mass murderers